Fung Wah Estate is a mixed TPS and public housing estate on a hill in southwest Chai Wan, Hong Kong Island, Hong Kong near Cape Collinson Crematorium. It consists of two residential blocks completed in 1991. Some of the flats were sold under Tenants Purchase Scheme Phase 3 in 2000.

King Tsui Court is a Home Ownership Scheme court in Chai Wan, next to Fung Wah Estate. It has only one residential block completed in 1991.

Houses

Fung Wah Estate

King Tsui Court

Demographics
According to the 2016 by-census, Fung Wah Estate had a population of 3,580. The median age was 46 and the majority of residents (93.3 per cent) were of Chinese ethnicity. The average household size was 2.9 people. The median monthly household income of all households (i.e. including both economically active and inactive households) was HK$25,950.

Politics
Fung Wah Estate and King Tsui Court are located in Fei Tsui constituency of the Eastern District Council. It was formerly represented by Joseph Lai Chi-keong, who was elected in the 2019 elections until July 2021.

See also

Public housing estates in Chai Wan and Siu Sai Wan

References

Chai Wan
Public housing estates in Hong Kong
Tenants Purchase Scheme
Residential buildings completed in 1991
1991 establishments in Hong Kong